ELC Electroconsult (ELC) is a historic Italian engineering firm established in 1955 by the major Italian private companies leading and pioneering since 1905 in planning, design and construction of hydropower schemes in the Alps.
The company is based in Milan (Italy).

ELC's worldwide activities concern study, design, construction management of dams, hydraulic structures, hydroelectric and multipurpose projects dealing with irrigation & agricultural development, as well as thermoelectric and geothermal power generation, power transmission and distribution systems, project construction management, environmental protection, social and institutional studies, project financing.

Significant projects

Itaipu, Brazilian/Paraguayan border
Inga Dam, Congo River
Kurobe Dam, Japan
Tachien Dam, Taiwan
Dez Dam, Iran
Damietta, Egypt
Mingechaur, Azerbaijan
Miravalles, Costa Rica
Momotombo, Nicaragua
Ahuachapán, El Salvador
Majes, Peru
Hydroelectric Projects on the Gilgel Gibe River (Gilgel Gibe I, II, III), Ethiopia
Ridracoli Dam, Italy

See also 

List of Italian companies

References

External links
ELC Electroconsult

Engineering consulting firms
Engineering companies of Italy
Companies based in Milan